Theodor Hagen may refer to:
 Theodor Hagen (music critic) (1823-1871), German-American journalist and critic
 Theodor Hagen (artist) (1842-1919), German landscape painter